Every 15 Minutes is a two-day program focusing on high school juniors and seniors, which challenges them to think about driving while drunk, personal safety, and the responsibility of making mature decisions. Along with alcohol-related crashes, it focuses on the impact that their decisions would have on family and friends.

The Every 15 Minutes program originated in Canada and was soon adopted in the United States first in Spokane, Washington. The site of the first Every 15 Minutes program in California was in Chico which was presented by the Chico Police Department in 1995. Officer Melody Davidson was the first to promote and organize Every 15 Minutes in Chico which was highlighted in a September 1996 LA Times article.

Planning and events

Planning
The Every 15 Minutes program starts months in advance of the actual presentation, in fact the very first program at a school will take about one-year to plan and prepare. This includes all of the involved agencies, the police, fire department, paramedics, hospital, court, lawyers, judge, jail facilities, coroner/funeral home, students, parents and school administrators. Student participants are selected to cover the full spectrum of the student body, thus, the audience will be able to relate to at least one of the participants on the crash day.

Recent advances
Due in large part to major grants and guidance by the Highway Patrol, the program has made its way to even more students' hometowns. In recent years, the California Highway Patrol has continued to fine-tune the Every 15 Minutes program, which has always been over two-days - day one being the crash, with day two as the assembly, featuring speakers ranging from the student participants and their parents to motivational speakers, relatives who have lost loved ones in drunk-driving crashes (there are no drunk-driving "accidents"), medical personnel, lawyers and law enforcement officials.

In southern California the program has also been modified by a civilian coordinator who has taken the audience away from watching on the sidewalk to sitting in bleachers, allowing for better viewing; eliminating the grim reaper (often viewed by students as unreal); and adding a texting element to the sober driver. This element brings the program added reality, as current figures indicate more teens are being killed in text-related crashes than in drunk-driving crashes. However, the grants are dedicated to drunk-driving and would be eliminated if too much emphasis was placed on texting. To still maintain the drinking emphasis, it is mentioned that the sober driver could have lessened the severity of injuries or death had they been concentrating on the road and not on the phone.

Since its inception, technology has improved, giving a rise to the impact of the program and the gravity of the issue of drunk driving. During the event, new technology has allowed for a quick turn around of videography, allowing a comprehensive video of the cause and effect relationship between drunken driving and police involvement, family burden and community loss to be played at the second day's assembly. While student videographers sometimes take on this job, it is more common for professional crews to do the work.  One early and frequent collaborator with the Every 15 Minutes program is Producer David Essary’s company Force4Digital, which has produced multiple productions yearly for California schools dating back to 2004.  More recently, there has been a revival of student work, as schools either ask for one or two of their students to apprentice with the professionals, or students create a "making-of" film, shadowing the entire E15 process.

Effectiveness
Studies that have tracked students before and after the Every 15 Minutes program have shown that the program may have a favorable short-term effect on students' stated attitudes but no effect on actual behavior. This has led to charges that the Every 15 Minutes program is similar to the controversial DARE anti-drug program in that it produces the appearance of addressing the problem but does not produce the desired change in behavior. It has been long known that these types of approaches (i.e. scare tactics, dramatizations) that attempt to increase awareness or improve knowledge are ineffective. 

Questions have also been raised about the basic premise of the program, that one person dies every 15 minutes in an alcohol-related crash. The National Highway Traffic Safety Administration reports that in 1995, the first year the program was presented, the rate was actually one death every 30.4 minutes in the United States.  This was using the NHTSA's very broad definition of "alcohol-related" wherein the crash was defined as "alcohol-related" if any person involved had a blood alcohol level of 0.01% or higher. The nationally recognized DUI level of presumption in the United States is 0.08%.  The rate of alcohol-related fatalities has gradually declined and was one death every 40.4 minutes in 2007, one death every 45 minutes in 2008, and one death every 56.5 minutes in 2015.

References

External links

Every 15 Minutes

Photos 
 Every 15 Minutes at Germantown High School 
 Every 15 Minutes at Menomonee Falls High School 
 Every 15 Minutes at West Bend East & West High Schools 
 Every 15 Minutes at Sage Creek High School

Videos 
Mammoth Lakes High School, CA Every 15 minutes
Rialto, CA Every 15 Minutes Videos 
St. Vincent High School, Petaluma, CA Every 15 Minutes Video
Kenilworth, NJ Every 15 Minutes
Sage Creek High School, Carlsbad, CA Every 15 minutes Video
Driving under the influence
Public health education
1995 introductions
Harm reduction